Livingston High School, in Livingston, California, United States, is a public secondary school in the Merced Union High School District. The school contains grades 9-12. Students come from Livingston Middle School and Ballico Middle School.

Administration
The new principal, beginning in the 2020-2021 school year, is Charles Jolly. Currently, the three associate principals are Lee Shaw, Melissa Doerksen and Kyle Mesa.

Scandals
In May 2011, a science teacher was arrested for helping students get intoxicated through the use of chloroform that she ordered through the school for her "lessons". A few days later, she was arrested for possession of explosives.

In May 2012, an agriculture teacher was charged with having had sex with a 15-year-old student in 2010 and 2011.

Courses
Classes are usually approximately an hour in length. Subjects include English, mathematics, science, social science,  foreign language, photography, art and band. Regional Occupation Program classes are also available in areas such as medical, business, education and computers.  The school provides tutoring to students in need of help for their classes.

Livingston High School also offers Advanced Placement (AP) college-level courses.  In the past, any student could register for any AP course.  However, in preparation for the coming school year, this policy has changed.  Students are now  required to sign a contract stating they would not drop any AP class, as well as get permission slips signed by teachers recommending them to a particular AP class.  This has caused some stir among the faculty and students.  A possible reason for the contract is so teachers don't end up teaching only a few students during a period, since they could be more useful teaching a regular class and cutting down class size on other teachers.  The following AP courses are available as of the 2011-2012 school year:

 AP Biology
 AP Calculus AB
 AP Chemistry
 AP English Language and Composition
 AP English Literature and Composition
 AP Government
 AP Spanish Language
 AP Statistics 
 AP United States History

References

External links
Livingston High School website
Livingston High School website (library)
http://www.greatschools.net/modperl/browse_school/ca/3416

High schools in Merced County, California
Public high schools in California